Wolfgang Amadeus Mozart's Piano Sonata No. 10 in C major, K. 330 / 300h, is one of the three works in the cycle of piano sonatas K.330-331-332. The sonata was composed in 1783, when Mozart was 27 years old. It was published, with the other two sonatas by Artaria in 1784. A typical performance of this sonata lasts around twenty minutes.

The work is one of Mozart's most popular piano sonatas, and has been featured in classical music-related films, such as Sparky's Magic Piano.  Mozart's autograph of the sonata is held in the Jagiellonian Library, Kraków.

Movements

I. Allegro moderato

The first movement typically takes about five to nine minutes to perform. The length of the movement depends largely on whether both repeats (the repeat of the exposition and the repeat of the development and recapitulation) are observed. The movement shows two clear major themes, which have been decorated by the use of ornamentation, as was typical of the time.

The movement is in typical sonata form (composed of exposition, development, and recapitulation).

The first subject is in tonic key of C major and modulates to the dominant, G major, for the exposition of the second subject. The development is more intense and contains wider modulations. In the recapitulation, the first subject is heard, again in C major. The music then modulates to G major, and then returns to C major for the recapitulation of the second subject in the tonic key.

II. Andante cantabile

The second movement takes between five and seven minutes to perform. The very end of the movement which Mozart wrote, an F major coda, was misplaced in the autograph but appears in the 1784 publication.

This key is F major, the subdominant of C major. After the exposition is heard twice, the music then modulates to the development in the parallel key of F minor, and its relative key (A-flat major). The movement then modulates to the tonic, for the recapitulation, followed by a short coda.

III. Allegretto

The third movement is the most energetic among the movements of the sonata. Performance times range from three to five minutes. Use of arpeggios is prevalent throughout the piece. Like the second movement, the last few bars were lost in the autograph as well.

References

External links

  (Alte Mozart-Ausgabe version)

Piano Sonata No. 10 sheet music is available at Musopen.com
Audio recording available at Musopen.com
Video recording of all 3 movements available at by Saten Simonyan

Piano Sonata 10
1783 compositions
Compositions in C major
Articles containing video clips